Museum  is a stop on the Luas light-rail tram system in Dublin, Ireland.  It opened in 2004 as a stop on the Red Line.  The stop is located between Croppies' Acre (a small memorial park) and the National Museum of Ireland – Decorative Arts and History.  It also provides access to the Arbour Hill Prison.  It has two edge platforms.  Northbound trams leave the stop and travel east through the streets of Dublin city centre to Connolly or The Point.  Southbound trams leave the stop and turn left, crossing the River Liffey on Seán Heuston Bridge, before calling at  Heuston on their way to Tallaght or Saggart.

References

Luas Red Line stops in Dublin (city)